Pteris longifolia, the longleaf brake is a species of fern in the Pteridoideae subfamily of the Pteridaceae.

References

longifolia
Plants described in 1753
Taxa named by Carl Linnaeus